Berechiah  is a Jewish name that occurs several times in the Bible.  It is derived from Berakhah, "blessing".

People named Berechiah

In scripture

In Isaiah 8:2, he is referred to by the longer form of the same name, Jeberechiah or Jeberekiah.

Other people with that name
 Berechiah ha-Nakdan, 13th century writer and fabulist
 Berechiah de Nicole, also known as Benedict fil Mosse, a 13th-century Tosafist who lived at Lincoln, England.
 Berechiah Berak ben Isaac Eisik Shapira (died 1664), Galician preacher.

References

External links
 Entry in Bartelby Encyclopedia

Set index articles on Hebrew Bible people